No One may refer to:

Music
No One (band)
No One (album), the sole studio album by the band of the same name

Songs 
 "No One" (Connie Francis song), 1964, also covered by Ray Charles and Brenda Lee
 "No One" (2 Unlimited song), 1994
 "No One" (Alicia Keys song), 2007
 "No One" (Aly & AJ song), 2005
 "No One (Can Ever Change My Mind)", by Stefanie Heinzmann, 2009
 "No One" (Maja Keuc song), 2010
 "No One" (Maverick Sabre song), 2012
 "No One", by Cold from their album 13 Ways to Bleed on Stage
 "No-One", by Dark Tranquillity from their album Projector
 "No One", by Fear Factory from their album Digimortal
 "Song for No One", by Alphaville
 "Song for No One", by Shawn Mendes from his album Wonder

Film and television
 No One (2005 film), a documentary film by Tin Dirdamal
 No-One (2018 film), an Israeli-Ukrainian film
 "No One" (Game of Thrones)

Other uses
No one, no-one or noone, an English indefinite pronoun
Outis, often used as a pseudonym
No One (ISP), a British internet service provider

See also
Noone, a surname
"No One Knows", a song by Queens of the Stone Age
Nobody (disambiguation)
No (disambiguation)
One (disambiguation)